Urecheşti may refer to several places in Romania:

 Urecheşti, a commune in Bacău County
 Urecheşti, a commune in Vrancea County
 Urecheşti, a village in Cicănești Commune, Argeș County
 Urecheşti, a village in Mischii Commune, Dolj County
 Urecheşti, a village in Drăguțești Commune, Gorj County